Menahem Saleh Daniel (1846-1940) was an Iraqi Jewish businessman, landowner, philanthropist and politician who served as Senate in the  Kingdom of Iraq and Deputy for Baghdad to the Ottoman Chamber of Deputies.

Biography
Menahem Saleh Daniel was born on 1 March 1846 in Baghdad, to Iraqi Jewish parents. He studied in the schools of Baghdad before moving to Europe to study science. He was elected on behalf of Baghdad as a representative in the Ottoman Chamber of Deputies in 1877. He became famous in commercial and economic circles and was known for his commercial relations with the country’s notables. Daniel was appointed as a member of the first board of directors of the Baghdad Brigade, which was founded by the governor, Medhat Pasha. After the establishment of the monarchy in Iraq, he became a member of the Senate of Iraq in 1925, representing the Mosaic Jewish community in Iraq. His son Ezra Saleh Daniel (1874-1952) succeeded him on the Senate.

His father Saleh Daniel, was famous for his charitable projects and had a palace located in Al-Sinak area. Menahem Daniel was known as "Man with the White Hand" as he founded and built the first orphanage for Muslim orphans and spent on it from his own money to help Muslim orphans and those from
different sects.

Philanthropy
Daniel made substantial donations to both Jewish and Muslim charities, and built a Muslim orphanage in 1928, and a Jewish primary school in 1910.

Personal life
His nephew was Sir Sassoon Eskell.

References

1846 births
1940 deaths
Iraqi Jews
People from Baghdad
Iraqi philanthropists
Jewish Iraqi politicians